Malcolm Blue Farm is a historic home and farm in Aberdeen, Moore County, North Carolina. The house is believed to date to 1825, and is a one-story, three bay, frame structure with a simple gable roof and vernacular Federal and Greek Revival style design elements.  It has a rear ell and full width front porch.  Also on the property are the contributing four small barns, packhouse, well, horse barns, building originally used as a grist mill, and wooden water tower.  The property is open to the public as a farm museum.

It was added to the National Register of Historic Places in 1982.

References

External links 
Malcolm Blue Farm Museum & Farmhouse website

Farm museums in North Carolina
Farms on the National Register of Historic Places in North Carolina
Federal architecture in North Carolina
Greek Revival houses in North Carolina
Houses completed in 1825
Buildings and structures in Moore County, North Carolina
Houses in Moore County, North Carolina
National Register of Historic Places in Moore County, North Carolina